Pauline Lesley Perry (born 13 August 1927, London) is a South African botanist, horticulturalist and plant collector.

Early life and education 
Pauline Lesley Perry studied at Wye College, University of London in 1946–1949, graduating Bachelor of Sciences, and then taught biology in the United Kingdom before coming to South Africa in 1972.

Career 
From 1976 Perry worked with the National Botanic Gardens of South Africa, stationed at the Karoo Botanic Granden, Worcester, specializing in geophytes from the winter rainfall region of the Cape, especially Namaqualand. She and Dierdre Anne Snijman made many field trips in this region. In 1984, Perry started collecting plants, especially spermatophytes. She published 85 names of plants.

Pauline Lesley Perry retired in 1989. After retirement, she continued publishing scientific articles and books, such as A vegetation survey of the Karoo National Botanic Garden Reserve, Worcester (1990), Growing Geophytes at the Karoo Gardens (1991),  A revision of the genus Eriospermum (Eriospermaceae) (1994), and Bulbinella in South Africa (1999) based on the part of a M.Sc. thesis submitted to the Botany Department of the University of Cape Town.

Generic plants’ name perryae honors Perry.

Works 

 A floristic analysis of the Nieuwoudtville Wild Flower Reserve north-western Cape. By Deirdre A. Snijman and Pauline L. Perry, 1987 
A vegetation survey of the Karoo National Botanic Garden Reserve, Worcester. By Jennifer Smitheman and Pauline Perry, 1990   
 Bulbinella - a Neglected Garden Plant? Veld & Flora, 1990 
Growing Geophytes at the Karoo Gardens (1991) 
A revision of the genus Eriospermum (Eriospermaceae). By Deirdre A. Snijman and Pauline L. Perry, 1994
Bylbinella in South Africa, 1999

Eponyms 

 Bokkeveldia perryae (Snijman) D.Müll.-Doblies & U.Müll.-Doblies 
 Strumaria perryae Snijman
 Lachenalia perryae G.D.Duncan

References 

1927 births
Living people
South African women botanists
20th-century South African botanists
20th-century South African women scientists
Alumni of Wye College